is a former Japanese politician who served in the House of Representatives in the Diet (national legislature) as a member of the Liberal Democratic Party. A native of Kyoto, Kyoto and graduate of Showa University and business school at Waseda University she was elected for the first time in 2005 after working at Shiseido and serving in the local assembly in Suginami, Tokyo. She was defeated in the 2009 election by former MP Osamu Fujimura of the DPJ.

References

External links

Members of the House of Representatives (Japan)
Female members of the House of Representatives (Japan)
Koizumi Children
Japanese pharmacists
Waseda University alumni
People from Kyoto
Living people
1962 births
Liberal Democratic Party (Japan) politicians
21st-century Japanese women politicians
Ryukyuan people